The 1993 Richmond Kickers season was the inaugural season for the club. In their first season of competitive soccer, the Kickers played in the United States Interregional Soccer League, which at the time served as the third division of the American soccer pyramid. The Kickers played their first season on the campus of the University of Richmond at the site of the former East Market Stadium. 

In the inaugural season the Kickers played in the Atlantic Division, where they finished in fourth place in the division, qualifying for the play-in round of the playoffs. Richmond defeated the Charleston Battery, who would eventually become bitter rivals with the team, as they were some of the few surviving clubs from the early 90s, in the play-in round, before eventually losing to the Greensboro Dynamo in the divisional playoff semifinals.

Squad

Roster 
The following players were part of the 1993 squad.

Team management 
The following individuals were part of the club's management for the 1993 season.

Competitions

Exhibitions

USISL regular season

Table

Atlantic Division

Results

USISL Playoffs

Transfers

In

Loan in

See also 
 List of Richmond Kickers seasons
 Richmond Kickers

References 

1993
American soccer clubs 1993 season
1993 in sports in Virginia